Henry Hill Hickman (27 January 1800 – 2 April 1830) was an English physician and promoter of anaesthesia.

Life

He was born to tenant farmers at Lady Halton, (near Bromfield, just outside Ludlow, Shropshire). He was the fifth of thirteen children.

He began his medical training at the Edinburgh Medical School aged 16 in 1819 and left without a degree in 1820, which was normal at the time. He was admitted as a Member of the Royal College of Surgeons in London in 1820. After qualifying, he began his medical career in 1821, in Ludlow and in early 1823 he began some rather gruesome animal experiments in anaesthesia. He would make the animal insensible, effectively via almost suffocating it with carbon dioxide, then amputate a part of the animal to see whether the animal could feel pain under this 'anaesthesia'. Later scientists used nitrous oxide, ether, and chloroform to achieve similar effects.

While living and practising in Shifnal, on 21 February 1824, Hickman wrote up his work and sent it to Thomas Andrew Knight of Downton Castle, near Ludlow, one of the Presidents of the Royal Society, perhaps intending that the information would reach Sir Humphry Davy. It is not known if Davy ever saw the pamphlet.

Hickman, disillusioned by the lack of response and wounded by an 1826 article in The Lancet titled 'Surgical Humbug' that ruthlessly criticised his work, turned to King Charles X of France in April 1828. Despite the support of Napoleon's field surgeon, Baron Dominique-Jean Larrey, who had noticed that wounded soldiers felt no pain when numbed by cold, Hickman met a similar response in France to that he had received in England.

With success eluding him, he returned to England and set up a new practice, in Teme Street, at number 18, in Tenbury Wells, Worcestershire. These premises are now occupied by an optician's practice. Hickman died aged 30 from syphilis, and was buried at Bromfield. Unappreciated at the time of his death, his work has since been positively reappraised and he is now recognised as one of the fathers of anaesthesia.

Tenbury Museum has an exhibition of items linked to Henry Hill Hickman.

Footnotes

External links 

 

British anaesthetists
1800 births
1830 deaths
People from Ludlow
People from Shifnal
19th-century English medical doctors
Alumni of the University of Edinburgh
People in health professions from Shropshire
People from Tenbury Wells